Jaeger Kahlen Partner is an international architecture and design firm which provides urban planning, architecture, interior and design services for clients in the fields of office, residential, culture, interiors and urban realm. The company is based with offices in Germany, Italy, and China. Established in 2007 as Jaeger & Partner, the company became Jaeger Kahlen Partner in 2015 following the successful long-term collaboration with Prof. Johannes Kahlen.

Recent works 
Today, Jaeger Kahlen Partner's projects are representing a large diversity of typologies: commercial office buildings, civic and cultural spaces, residential and hospitality developments, educational and research facilities, mixed-use commercial developments and master-panning. In 2011, the company was awarded with AIA Chicago Design Excellence Award in the Unbuilt Design category for their project Shenzhen Archives in partnership with Saltans Architects. Currently their major under-construction project is Nanshan iPark (former NFU Technology Park).

Selected projects 
 Guangfa Securities Headquarters, Guangzhou, China (2010–2018): recognized by CTBUH as one of the 20 tallest buildings completed in 2018.

 Hybrid Tower (Huitong Tower), Shenzhen, China (2012–2019): office & mechanical car park hybrid tower, currently the largest vertical car park in Shenzhen, China.

 Nanshan iPark, Shenzhen, China (2009 – Now)

See also 
 List of architecture firms

References

External links 
 Official Website
 CTBUH Member Page

Architecture firms of Germany
Companies based in Aachen
Design companies established in 2007
German companies established in 2007